Sugarless Girl is the eighth album by the Japanese electronica band Capsule, released on February 21, 2007. The tracks "Sugarless GiRL" and "Starry sky" (now stylized as "Starry Sky") are shortened versions of the songs on the single "Starry sky" (previously released on December 13, 2006). "Reality" (now stylized as "REALiTY") is a remix from the single version.

A remastered version, Sugarless GiRL (2021 Remaster), was released in 2021.

Track list

References

Links　
 

Capsule (band) albums
Albums produced by Yasutaka Nakata
2007 albums